Krewe of Okeanos is a New Orleans Mardi Gras krewe.

Parade

History 

The Krewe of Okeanos is a New Orleans Mardi Gras parading Krewe organized in 1949 by civic-minded business leaders who were eager to bring a Carnival parade to St. Claude Avenue, their neighborhood’s main street. The club is named for the Greek god of oceans and fertile valleys and is sponsored by the Sonaeko (Okeanos spelled backwards) Club.  Okeanos presented its first ball and parade in 1950. The original parade route has changed, we now roll on the extended Uptown Route. In place of the traditional ball masque, the club presents an elegant Coronation Ball at which its King is presented, and his Queen is selected by random draw during the Ball..

Parade themes

Throws 
Trinkets, collectables, doubloons, and beads tossed by hand from riders of the floats are throws. Collectible throws from Krewe of Okeanos include custom cups, 10-gauge multi-colored doubloons, frisbees, crawfish trays, sand pails, glass beads, and cufflinks.

Royal court 
During the krewe's annual Coronation Ball, the parade’s King is introduced to the membership and his Queen is determined by kismet from the Court’s Maids.

References 

Mardi Gras in New Orleans